Old Vatia is a prehistoric village site on the north side of Tutuila, the largest island of American Samoa.  The site is located on the Faiga ridge, above the modern village of Vatia in the National Park of American Samoa.  It is stretched linearly along the ridge, with terraced areas that have features such as stone house foundations and pavement.  The site, believed to have been occupied c. 1300–1750, is one of the island's few upland village sites.  It was first identified in the 1960s and recorded in detail in 1989.

The site was listed on the National Register of Historic Places in 2006.

See also
National Register of Historic Places listings in American Samoa

References

Tutuila
National Register of Historic Places in American Samoa
National Register of Historic Places in national parks